Wolfgang Amadeus Mozart's String Duo No. 1 in G major for violin and viola, K. 423, the first of the two Mozart wrote [see String Duo No. 2 (Mozart)] to complete Michael Haydn's set of six for the Archbishop Colloredo. It was written in the summer of 1783. It is in three movements:

 Allegro, common time
 Adagio, C major, 3/4
 Rondeau: Allegro, cut time

While both Mozart's and Haydn's duos give the viola many double stops, Mozart's duos differ in that the viola also gets many passages in sixteenths, almost in equal proportion to the violin. H. C. Robbins Landon notes in particular of K. 423 that Mozart had retained the knowledge he gained in writing the String Quartet in G major, K. 387 (the finale of which was in turn influenced by Haydn's Symphony No. 23).

The set of six was presented as all Haydn's, and Colloredo was unable to "detect in them Mozart's obvious workmanship."

By transposing the viola part an octave down and changing to bass clef, the piece is readily playable on cello. Werner Rainer edited such a transcription for Verlag Doblinger.
The Austrian composer Gerhard Präsent has made an arrangement for string trio (2 violins & violoncello) in 2012, regularly performed by the ALEA Ensemble.

The G major Duo is almost always paired with the B-flat major Duo, K. 424. The Hungaroton label has a 2-CD set of the Mozart and Haydn duos with Barnabas Kelemen and Katalin Kokas. The Avie label prefers to put Mozart's duos (played by Phillipe Graffin and Nobuko Imai) on a 2-CD set with other pieces by Mozart, such as the Violin Concerto in G, K. 216, and the Sinfonia Concertante in E-flat major, K. 364. The Odeum Guitar Duo has recorded a transcription of K. 423 for two guitars.

References

External links
 

Performance of String Duo No. 1 by Chad Hoopes (violin) and Matthew Lipman (viola) from the Isabella Stewart Gardner Museum in MP3 format

Chamber music by Wolfgang Amadeus Mozart
Compositions in G major
1783 compositions